Pot Boiler is a 2007 album by The Verlaines on Flying Nun Records.

Track listing 
All songs written by Graeme Downes except "Sunday in Sevastopol",
music by Graeme Downes, lyrics by David Kominsky.
 "Midlife Crisis" – 3:19
 "Stop Messing Around" – 2:58
 "It's Easier to Harden a Broken Heart (than mend it)" – 4:56
 "Don't Leave" – 3:16
 "Forgive Thine Enemies (but don't forget their names)" – 3:03
 "Tragic Boy" – 4:15
 "Sunday in Sevastopol" – 5:11
 "All Messed Up" – 3:29
 "16 Years" – 3:01
 "If You Can't Beat Them" – 4:10
 "Real Good Life" – 4:00

Personnel 
 Graeme Downes
 Darren Stedman
 Russell Fleming
 Paul Winders
 Gary Valentine – Trumpet
 Dan Bendrups – Trombone
 Kevin A. Lefohn – Violin
 Kate Hamilton – Viola
 Greg Hamilton – Cello
 Libby Hamilton – Backing vocals
 Anthony Lander – Backing vocals
 Dale Cotton – Mixing

Reviews 
 Review at muzic.net.nz
 Review at A Jumped-up Pantry Boy
 Review at New Zealand Listener

External links 
 Article and interview at NZ Musician

The Verlaines albums
Flying Nun Records albums
2007 albums